Thallumetus is a genus of cribellate araneomorph spiders in the family Dictynidae, and was first described by Eugène Simon in 1893.

Species
 it contains ten species:
Thallumetus acanthochirus Simon, 1904 – Chile
Thallumetus dulcineus Gertsch, 1946 – Panama
Thallumetus latifemur (Soares & Camargo, 1948) – Brazil
Thallumetus octomaculellus (Gertsch & Davis, 1937) – Mexico
Thallumetus parvulus Bryant, 1942 – Virgin Is.
Thallumetus pineus (Chamberlin & Ivie, 1944) – USA
Thallumetus pullus Chickering, 1952 – Panama
Thallumetus pusillus Chickering, 1950 – Panama
Thallumetus salax Simon, 1893 (type) – Venezuela
Thallumetus simoni Gertsch, 1945 – Guyana

References

Araneomorphae genera
Dictynidae
Spiders of North America
Spiders of South America
Taxa named by Eugène Simon